George Pattison (born 1950) is a retired English theologian and Anglican priest. His last post prior to retirement was as Professor of Divinity at the University of Glasgow. He was previously Lady Margaret Professor of Divinity at the University of Oxford. From 2017-2019 he was a Senior Co-Fund Fellow at the Max Weber Center at the University of Erfurt. He has also been an Affiliate Professor in Systematic Theology at the University of Copenhagen (2011 -) and an Honorary Professor in the Faculty of Theology at the University of St Andrew's (2021-)

Early life and education
He holds a Bachelor of Divinity and MA from the University of Edinburgh and a PhD from the University of Durham.

Academic career
Pattison was Dean of the Chapel of King's College, Cambridge (1991–2001), and then an associate professor at the University of Århus (2002–03).

In 2004, Pattison succeeded John Webster as Lady Margaret Professor of Divinity at the University of Oxford. He was also a Canon of Christ Church Cathedral, Oxford from 2004 to 2013.

Pattison became 1640 Chair of Divinity at the University of Glasgow in 2013, succeeding Werner Jeanrond who then became Master of St Benet's Hall at the University of Oxford in 2012. In 2017, Pattison gave the Bampton Lectures at the University of Oxford; the series was titled "A Phenomenology of the Devout Life". These have now been published as first of a three part 'Philosophy of Christian Life' under the same title.  Parts 2 and 3 are entitled "A Rhetorics of the Word"   and "A Metaphysics of Love". 

Pattison's works range from historical, theological and philosophical engagement with the critical reception of German Idealism in such figures as Søren Kierkegaard, Martin Heidegger and Fyodor Dostoyevsky to theological studies of the aesthetics of film and the visual arts.  His latest work has used existential phenomenology to explore themes of ontology, language, love and the meaning of God.

Selected works
 Art, Modernity and Faith (1991)
 Kierkegaard: the Aesthetic and the Religious (1992)
 Agnosis: Theology in the Void (1996)
 Kierkegaard and the Crisis of Faith (1997)
 The End of Theology and the Task of Thinking about God (1998)
 Anxious Angels (1999)
 The Later Heidegger (2000)
 A Short Course in the Philosophy of Religion (2001)
 Dostoevsky and the Christian Tradition (ed. with D.Thompson, 1991)
 A Short Course in Christian Doctrine (2005)
 The Philosophy of Kierkegaard (2005)
 Thinking about God in an Age of Technology (2006)
 Crucifixions and Resurrections of the Image: Reflections on Art and Modernity (SCM, 2009)
 God and Being (OUP, 2011)
 A Phenomenology of the Devout Life (OUP, 2018)
 A Rhetorics of the Word' (OUP, 2019)
 A Metaphysics of Love' (OUP, 2021)

See also
 Faculty of Theology and Religion, University of Oxford

References

 Post vacant

1950 births
20th-century Anglican theologians
20th-century English Anglican priests
21st-century English theologians
21st-century Anglican theologians
21st-century English Anglican priests
Alumni of Durham University Graduate Society
English Anglican theologians
Fellows of Christ Church, Oxford
Fellows of King's College, Cambridge
Lady Margaret Professors of Divinity
Living people
Systematic theologians